Ste. Rose was a provincial electoral division in the Canadian province of Manitoba.  It was created by redistribution in 1914, and existed until 2011.

Ste. Rose was located in the southwestern section of the province. It was bordered to the north by Swan River, to the west by Russell, Dauphin-Roblin and Minnedosa, to the south by Turtle Mountain and to the east by Lake Manitoba.

Communities in the riding included Gladstone, Neepawa, McCreary, Ste. Rose, Ste. Rose du Lac and Westbourne.

The riding's population in 1996 was 19,038. In 1999, the average family income was $36,883, and the unemployment rate was 7.60%. Much of the riding was farmland and agriculture accounted for 29% of its industry, followed by health and social services at 11%. Twenty-six per cent of Ste. Rose's population was aboriginal, and 8% were German. There was once a significant francophone population in this region, and 4% of the riding's residents listed themselves as francophone. Over 25% of the population had less than a Grade Nine education, one of the highest rates in the province.

From the 1930s to the 1970s, Ste. Rose was a safe seat for the Manitoba Liberal Party (formerly known as the Liberal-Progressive Party).  The New Democratic Party held the seat from 1971 to 1986, at which time it was won by Glen Cummings of the Progressive Conservative Party. He held the seat until 2007 when he retired. The riding was won by Progressive Conservative Party candidate Stu Briese.

Following the 2008 electoral redistribution, Ste. Rose was dissolved into the riding of Interlake and the new ridings of Dauphin, and Agassiz. This change took effect for the 2011 election.

List of provincial representatives

Electoral results

1914 general election

1915 general election

1920 general election

1922 general election

1927 general election

1932 general election

1936 general election

1941 general election

1945 general election

1949 general election

1953 general election

1958 general election

1959 general election

1962 general election

1966 general election

1969 general election

1971 by-election

1973 general election

1977 general election

1981 general election

1986 general election

1988 general election

1990 general election

1995 general election

1999 general election

2003 general election

2007 general election

References

Former provincial electoral districts of Manitoba